Gregory Anthony Kriegsmann (1946–2018) was Distinguished Professor of Mathematics and Foundation Chair at New Jersey Institute of Technology’s department of Mathematical Sciences.

Education
Gregory received his BS in Electrical Engineering (1969) from Marquette University, MS in Electrical Engineering (1970), MA in Mathematics (1972) and PhD in Applied Mathematics (1974) from University of California at Los Angeles.

Research interests
Gregory's research focuses include applied mathematics, asymptotic methods, differential equations, bifurcation theory, wave propagation, acoustics, electromagnetic fields, circuit theory and more.

Honors
Gregory was elected as a (first batch) Fellow of the Society for Industrial and Applied Mathematics (SIAM) in 2009.

Doctoral students
According to the Mathematics Genealogy Project, Gregory mentored a total 10 doctoral students (total of 17 descendants) at Northwestern University and New Jersey Institute of Technology including John Pelesko.

Others
He was an Associate Editor of  Analysis and Applications, Journal of Engineering Mathematics (JEMA), IMA Journal of Applied Mathematics (IMA) and European Journal of Applied Mathematics.

References

External links
 'New Jersey Institute of Technology : NJIT Mathematicians Named First Fellows of Math Society'
 
 'NJIT Department of Mathematical Sciences : Gregory A Kriegsmann'

1946 births
2018 deaths
20th-century American mathematicians
21st-century American mathematicians
New Jersey Institute of Technology faculty